Eric Ashley Thomas (December 1, 1973 – December 30, 2022) was an American hurdler who represented his native country at the 2000 Summer Olympics in Sydney, Australia. He set his personal best (47.94) in the men's 400 m hurdles event on June 13, 2000, in Rome, Italy.

Achievements

Later life and death
Eric Thomas founded Champion Trainers, LLC in 2005 to train young athletes for success in their chosen sports activities. Champion Trainers provides individualized fitness and athletic programs to improve endurance, speed, agility, flexibility, mechanics and overall performance.

Thomas died on December 30, 2022, at the age of 49.

Charity
The Eric Thomas Foundation, a 501(c) (3) non-profit charitable organization, was organized to raise scholarship funds for youth who wish to pursue higher education and to improve the health and fitness of Texas youths. The Eric Thomas Foundation seeks to target high school athletes and/or students who would otherwise be unable to acquire financial assistance and support, and will make the dream of obtaining higher education a reality. The Eric Thomas Scholarship was presented to its first recipient at Garrison High School on May 17, 2011.

References

External links

1973 births
2022 deaths
American male hurdlers
Athletes (track and field) at the 2000 Summer Olympics
Athletes (track and field) at the 1999 Pan American Games
Athletes (track and field) at the 2003 Pan American Games
Olympic track and field athletes of the United States
People from Carthage, Texas
Track and field athletes from Texas
Junior college men's track and field athletes in the United States
Pan American Games medalists in athletics (track and field)
Pan American Games silver medalists for the United States
Medalists at the 1999 Pan American Games
Medalists at the 2003 Pan American Games